Cavally Region is one of the 31 regions of Ivory Coast. From its establishment in 2011, to 2014 it was in Montagnes District. The seat of the region is Guiglo and the region's population in the 2021 census was 708,241.

Cavally is currently divided into four departments: Bloléquin, Guiglo, Taï, and Toulépleu.

Notes

 
Regions of Montagnes District
States and territories established in 2011
2011 establishments in Ivory Coast